Ferran Jutglà Blanch (born 1 February 1999) is a Spanish professional footballer who plays as a forward for Belgian Pro League side Club Brugge.

He spent most of his youth at Espanyol, but made no first-team appearances and was released in 2021, going on to play nine games and score twice for Barcelona. In 2022, he signed for Club Brugge for €5 million, winning the Belgian Super Cup in his first game.

Club career

Espanyol
Born in Sant Julià de Vilatorta, Barcelona, Catalonia, Jutglà joined Espanyol's youth setup in 2012, after representing Sant Julià de Vilatorta CF and Vic Riuprimer REFO FC. He left the former club in 2015, and subsequently played for Vic and Unificación Bellvitge before signing for Sant Andreu in 2017.

Initially joining the Juvenil A squad, Jutglà made his senior debut on 20 August 2017, playing the last 12 minutes in a 0–0 Tercera División home draw against Santboià. He scored his first senior goal on 3 September, netting his team's second in a 2–0 home win over Pobla de Mafumet.

On 14 February 2018, after eight first team matches, Jutglà was transferred to Valencia and immediately returned to the youth setup. He returned to Espanyol on 18 July, but was immediately loaned back to Sant Andreu for the 2018–19 season. He was a regular starter before returning to his parent club in July 2019, and was subsequently assigned to the B-team in Segunda División B.

In July 2020, Jutglà was called up for the first team under manager Francisco Rufete for a La Liga game against Eibar, but did not play. On 22 June 2021, despite featuring regularly for the B's, Espanyol announced that Jutglà would leave the club at the expiration of his contract on 30 June.

Barcelona
On 22 June 2021, just hours after announcing his departure from Espanyol, Jutglà signed a one-year contract with city rivals FC Barcelona, being initially assigned to the reserves in Primera División RFEF. He made his debut for Barça B on 28 August, starting in a 1–1 home draw against Algeciras CF.

Jutglà scored his first goal for the B's on 24 September 2021, netting his team's second in a 2–1 home win over Linense. On 11 December, he was called up by first team manager Xavi to trainings.

On 12 December 2021, Jutglà made his first team – and La Liga – debut for Barcelona, coming on as a late substitute for goalscorer Abde Ezzalzouli in a 2–2 away draw against Osasuna. On his first match as a starter six days later, he scored the opener of a 3–2 home win over Elche. On 26 May, he announced his departure from the club in a Twitter post.

Club Brugge
On 8 June 2022, Club Brugge announced the signing of Jutglà on a four-year deal for a transfer fee of €5 million. He made his debut on 17 July, starting in their 1–0 Belgian Super Cup victory over Gent. On 13 September, he converted a penalty in a 4–0 away Champions League group win away to Porto, his first goal in the competition.

International career
On 24 May 2022, Jutglà was called up by manager Gerard López of the unofficial Catalonia national football team for a match against Jamaica in Girona, replacing Dani Olmo. In the game the following day, he came on in the 59th minute for hat-trick scorer Gerard Deulofeu and scored the fifth goal of a 6–0 win.

Career statistics

Club

Honours
Club Brugge
Belgian Super Cup: 2022

References

External links

1999 births
Living people
People from Osona
Sportspeople from the Province of Barcelona
Spanish footballers
Footballers from Catalonia
Association football wingers
Association football forwards
La Liga players
Primera Federación players
Segunda División B players
Tercera División players
UE Sant Andreu footballers
RCD Espanyol B footballers
FC Barcelona Atlètic players
FC Barcelona players
RCD Espanyol footballers
Catalonia international footballers
Club Brugge KV players
Belgian Pro League players
Spanish expatriate footballers
Expatriate footballers in Belgium
Spanish expatriate sportspeople in Belgium